Katonah may refer to:

 Katonah (Native American leader)
 Katonah, New York, a hamlet within the town of Bedford
 Katonah (album), a music album by Apollo Sunshine, named after the above hamlet

See also 
 Katona